Anna Larsson (born 10 September 1966) is a Swedish contralto. As a student she attended the Adolf Fredrik's Music School in Stockholm. Her international debut was made with the Berlin Philharmonic and the conductor Claudio Abbado in a performance of Gustav Mahler's Symphony No. 2 in 1997. In 2005 received a Grammy nomination for her recording of Richard Strauss Daphne together with WDR Symphony Orchestra Cologne conducted by Semyon Bychkov.

Awards
2010: appointed Hovsångerska by H.M. the King of Sweden

References

External links 
 Anna Larsson website

1966 births
Swedish opera singers
Operatic contraltos
Living people